Logan Valley Mall is a regional shopping mall in Altoona, Pennsylvania, United States. It is currently anchored by JCPenney and Macy's and features over 60 stores and services on two levels.

History
Logan Valley Mall opened in November 1965 as an open-air shopping center with Sears, Weis Markets and a few small shops. In 1966, JCPenney was constructed and the mall was enclosed for a grand opening on June 8, 1967. In May 1976, a four-screen movie theater opened in the mall.  In 1979, another expansion was completed by Crown American with the construction of Hess's department store.  By the mid-1990's, the mall had over 100 stores and services.

In the early morning hours of December 16, 1994, a fire of unknown origin broke out in the G.C. Murphy store and quickly spread through most of the original section of the mall, which did not have fire sprinklers.  15 stores and 9 kiosks were destroyed and dozens more were damaged.  A three-phase plan was immediately laid out to reconstruct the mall.  The first phase beginning in 1995 started with a new store, Kaufmann's, which was added to the far end of the mall to replace the then-vacant Hess's.  The already built, undamaged two-story portion of the mall was renovated, and these renovations included changeovers such as the re-branding of Wall To Wall Sound & Video to The Wall and temporary relocation of restaurants such as Wong's Wok.  Another phase one project was the construction of a new two-story section to replace the portion damaged by the fire.  This was completed in May of 1996.  Phase two consisted of opening a new three-story parking garage and a new eight-screen Carmike Cinema.  Phase three was completed in 1997 and included the openings of a new larger JCPenney store closer to Sears and a new food court on the renovated second floor of the old Penney's store.

Pennsylvania Real Estate Investment Trust (PREIT) acquired the mall in 2003 as part of its merger with Crown American.  The May Department Stores Company, which owned Kaufmann's, was sold to Federated Department Stores in 2005.  Federated proceeded to convert various May properties to Macy's, including the Logan Valley Mall store.  In 2017, the Carmike Cinema was re-branded AMC Classic following AMC's acquisition of the Carmike chain.  Also in 2017, the mall was sold to Mason Asset Management and Namdar Realty Group.

On December 28, 2018, it was announced that the mall's Sears store would be closing as part of a plan to close 80 stores nationwide. The store closed on March 3, 2019.

On July 7, 2021, it was announced that the AMC CLASSIC Logan Valley 8 had closed permanently, as a result of the COVID-19 pandemic.

See also
List of shopping malls in Pennsylvania

References

External links

Shopping malls in Pennsylvania
Buildings and structures in Altoona, Pennsylvania
Shopping malls established in 1965
Tourist attractions in Blair County, Pennsylvania
Namdar Realty Group